Fady Qaddoura is a Palestinian American politician from Indianapolis. A member of the Democratic Party, he was elected to represent Senate District 30 in the Indiana Senate in the 2020 general election, becoming the first Arab Muslim lawmaker in the state's history. In the election, he defeated his Republican opponent, winning 52.5% of the vote.

Life 
Qaddoura was born in the West Bank, State of Palestine to Palestinian parents. Qaddoura traveled at the age of 18 to study computer science in the US. He lost his home in 2005 after Hurricane Katrina.

Qaddoura studied at the University of New Orleans and obtained a bachelor's and master's degrees in computer science. And from Rice University, he holds a master's degree in public administration and nonprofit management, and later, he holds a doctorate in philosophy in philanthropy and public policy from Indiana University – Purdue University Indianapolis.

He has worked in scientific research at the University of Texas System and the University of New Orleans.

References

External links 
 Campaign website

1980 births
Living people
Indiana University–Purdue University Indianapolis alumni
University of New Orleans alumni
Palestinian emigrants to the United States
Rice University alumni
American politicians of Palestinian descent
American Muslims
Democratic Party Indiana state senators
University of Texas faculty
University of New Orleans faculty
American computer scientists
Palestinian Muslims